The WSL World Heavyweight Championship was a professional wrestling world championship in the Wrestling Superstars Live promotion. It was originally known as the AWA Superstars of Wrestling World Heavyweight Championship.

History
In 1996, Dale Gagner and his associate Jonnie Stewart, former American Wrestling Association (AWA) employees, filed corporate papers to license the AWA name in the state of Minnesota and formed an organization known as AWA Superstars of Wrestling. On June 6 of that year, Gagner and Stewart created their version of the AWA World Heavyweight Championship, recognizing all previous AWA world champions. 

In April 2007 World Wrestling Entertainment (WWE) filed a lawsuit against Dale Gagner and Jonnie Stewart, citing trademark infringement, as WWE owned all "American Wrestling Association" properties due to their purchase of the company after the original AWA's closure. In October 2008, a court ruled against Gagner and Stewart and ruled in favor of WWE. The court ruling prohibited Gagner and his associates from exploiting or trading on the AWA name or any other derivatives. As a result, the organization was renamed to Wrestling Superstars Live (WSL). Due to there no longer being connections to the original AWA, WSL began only recognizing championship reigns from 1996 and forward.

Title history

Combined reigns

American Wrestling Affiliates version

Combined reigns

References

Pro Wrestling Zero1 championships
World heavyweight wrestling championships
World professional wrestling championships
Wrestling Superstars Live